Polydrusus impressifrons, known generally as the pale green weevil or leaf weevil, is a species of broad-nosed weevil in the beetle family Curculionidae. It is found in North America & South Asia

Subspecies
These two subspecies belong to the species Polydrusus impressifrons:
 Polydrusus impressifrons danieli (Hoffmann, 1959) c g
 Polydrusus impressifrons impressifrons g
Data sources: i = ITIS, c = Catalogue of Life, g = GBIF, b = Bugguide.net

References

Further reading

External links

 

Entiminae
Articles created by Qbugbot
Beetles described in 1834